Arturo Salazar Mejía (April 11, 1921 – November 1, 2009) was the Roman Catholic bishop of the Roman Catholic Diocese of Pasto, Colombia.

Ordained on February 6, 1944, Salazar Mejía was made a  bishop by Pope Paul VI on October 14, 1965, and was ordained on January 6, 1966, retiring on February 6, 1995.

Notes

1921 births
2009 deaths
20th-century Roman Catholic bishops in Colombia
Roman Catholic bishops of Pasto